The Africa Magic Viewers' Choice Award for Best Overall Film is an annual category presented by MultiChoice, celebrating the best African film for the preceding year.

References 

Awards for best film
Best Overall Movie